Fabiana Bytyqi (born 30 December 1995) is a Czech professional boxer of Kosovan descent. She has held the WBC female atomweight title since 2018. Bytyqi is the first female boxer from the Czech Republic to win a major world title. As of May 2020, she is ranked as the world's sixth best active female atomweight by BoxRec.

Career

Early career
Fabiana Bytyqi made her professional debut on 7 March 2015 at the Maritim Hotel in Magdeburg, Germany against Andrea Jenei. Bytyqi won the fight by technical knockout. Bytyqi won her next five fights before being booked to face Teodora Bacheva for the vacant WBC Youth female minimumweight title. The title bout took place on 5 March 2016, at the Home Monitoring Aréna in Plzeň, Czech Republic. She won the fight by unanimous decision, with all three judges scoring it 96–94 in her favor. Bytyqi faced Teodora Bacheva in an immediate rematch in her first title defense, which took place 25 June 2022. Bacheva retired from the fight at the end of the seventh round. Bytyqi made her second title defense against Halima Vunjabei on 19 November 2016. She won the fight by a dominant unanimous decision, with two scorecards of 99–91 and one scorecard of 100–90.

Bytyqi faced Evgeniya Zablotskaya in a non-title bout on 11 March 2017. She won the fight by unanimous decision, with scores of 99–93, 98–92 and 98–92. Six months later, on 30 September 2017, Bytyqi faced Luisana Bolívar in her third and final WBC Youth title defense. She retained her title by unanimous decision, with scores of 98–93, 97–93 and 96–94. Bytyqi would next face Fatuma Yazidu for the vacant WBC Silver female minimumweight title on 2 December 2017. She captured her second professional regional title by a second-round technical knockout.

WBC Atomweight champion
On 5 September 2018, it was revealed that Bytyqi would face the once defeated Denise Castle for the vacant WBC atomweight title. Castle entered the bout following a four-year long absence from the sport of boxing, with her sole loss coming against Momo Koseki in her first WBC title fight. The fight took place at the Sportcentrum Sluneta in Ústí nad Labem, on 22 September 2018. She won the fight by unanimous decision, with two judges awarding her a 100–90 scorecard, while the third judge awarded her a 99–91 scorecard. Bytyqi became the first female boxer from the Czech Republic to win a major world title.

After obtaining her first world title, Bytyqi made her first title defense on 6 April 2019 against Soledad Vargas at the same venue in which she captured the belt, the Sportcentrum Sluneta in Ústí nad Labem. Bytyqi managed to defend her crown by split decision draw after 10 rounds against the Mexican boxer. Judge Ondrej Holubek scored the bout 97–96 for Bytyqi, judge Esa Lehtosaari scored the bout 98–93 for Vargas, while judge Jan Teleki scored it as an even 95–95 draw. Both fighters stated their desire for a rematch.

Bytyqi made her second championship defense against the six-time world title challenger Ana Arrazola on 30 November 2019, at the Sportovni Hala Kladno in Kladno, Czech Republic. She retained her title by unanimous decision, with two scorecards of 96–94 and one scorecard of 97–93.

Bytyqi faced Claudia Ferenczi in a non-title bout on 25 September 2020. She won the fight by unanimous decision. Bytyqi went on to fight in three more non-title bouts: she beat Judit Hachbold by unanimous decision on 27 February 2021,  Fara El Bousairi by majority decision on 2 October 2021, and Ivanka Ivanova by unanimous decision on 5 March 2022.

Bytyqi made her second WBC atomweight title defense against Elizabeth Lopez Corzo on 29 July 2022, nearly three years after her previous championship defense happened. The bout took place at the Palestra "Bill Clinton" in Ferizaj, Kosovo. The fight was ruled a split decision draw, with one scorecard of 97–94 in her favor and one scorecard of 97–96 for her opponent. The third judge scored the bout a 96–96 draw.

Professional boxing record

See also
List of WBC Female World Champions

References

1995 births
Living people
Sportspeople from Ústí nad Labem
Atomweight boxers
Czech female boxers
World Boxing Council champions
Czech people of Kosovan descent